Edward Sels (born 27 August 1941 at Vorselaar, Belgium) is a former Belgian professional road bicycle racer. He was professional from 1963 to 1972, winning 35 races. He was road champion of Belgium in 1961 (Military) and 1964. He won seven stages in the Tour de France and one in the Giro d'Italia. He wore the yellow jersey for two days in the 1964 Tour de France. His sister, Rosa Sels, was a cyclist too.

Major results

1962
Tour of Flanders, U23
Sint-Lenaerts
1963
Antoing
Bruxelles – Liège for independents (semi-professionals)
Hoogstraten
Machelen
Sint-Lenaerts
1964
Auvelais
Braine-le-Comte
Dendermonde
Herentals
Heusden O-Vlaanderen
 National road championship
Tour de France:
Winner stages 1, 11, 14 and 19
Wearing yellow jersey for two days
Oostrozebeke
Opwijk
Sint-Lambrechts-Woluwe
Vuelta a España:
Winner stage 1A
Waregem
1965
Ath
Eeklo
Issoire
Lebbeke
Lokeren
Londerzeel
Mol
Paris–Brussels
Saint-Claud
Tour de France:
Winner stage 7
Westerlo
Zwevegem
1966
Aalst
Bankprijs
Herentals
Laarne
Libramont
Tour de France:
Winner stages 6 and 22A
Mol
Tour of Flanders
Rumbeke
Schaal Sels
Sint-Lambrechts-Woluwe (BEL)
Stabroek
1967
Antwerpse pijl
Breendonk
Circuit des Frontières
Essen
Garancières-en-Beauce
GP Kanton Aargau Gippingen
Kalmthout
Ronde van Limburg
Stekene
Tessenderlo
Westerlo
1968
Auvelais
Herne
Honselersdijk
Schaal Sels
Scheldeprijs Vlaanderen
Sint-Katelijne-Waver
Sint-Niklaas
1969
Vuelta a España:
Winner stage 6
1970
Knokke

External links 

Official Tour de France results for Edward Sels

Belgian male cyclists
Belgian Tour de France stage winners
Belgian Giro d'Italia stage winners
Belgian Vuelta a España stage winners
1941 births
Living people
Cyclists from Antwerp Province
People from Vorselaar